Fritz Grösche (3 October 1941 – 24 October 2010) was a German professional football player and coach.

Career
Grösche played club football for Mindener SV, Westfalia Herne and SV Sodingen.

After retiring as a player, Grösche coached a number of German teams, including FC Gütersloh, TuS Schloß Neuhaus, SC Verl, Arminia Bielefeld and SC Wiedenbrück II.

Death
Grösche died on 24 October 2010, from cancer, at the age of 69.

References

External links

1941 births
2010 deaths
German footballers
Association football midfielders
German football managers
Arminia Bielefeld managers
Deaths from cancer in Germany
2. Bundesliga managers
FC Gütersloh 2000 managers
SC Paderborn 07 managers